Kaino Lempinen (8 February 1921 – 13 September 2003) was a Finnish gymnast who competed in the 1952 Summer Olympics.

References

1921 births
2003 deaths
Finnish male artistic gymnasts
Olympic gymnasts of Finland
Gymnasts at the 1952 Summer Olympics
Olympic bronze medalists for Finland
Olympic medalists in gymnastics
Medalists at the 1952 Summer Olympics
20th-century Finnish people